Maughold (also known as Macaille, Maccaldus, Machalus, Machaoi, Machella, Maghor, Mawgan, Maccul, Macc Cuill; died c. 488 AD) is venerated as the patron saint of the Isle of Man. Tradition states that he was an Irish prince and captain of a band of freebooters who was converted to Christianity by Saint Patrick. His feast day is 25 April. His original name is unclear, but was probably adapted from Bishop MacCaille of Croghan, County Offaly, who received Brigit of Kildare into religious life

Legend

One local legend relates that Maughold tried to make a fool out of Patrick. Maughold had, according to this story, placed a living man in a shroud. He then called for Patrick to try to revive the allegedly dead man. Patrick came, placed a hand on the shroud, and left. When Maughold and his friends opened the shroud, they found the man had died in the interim. One of Maughold's friends, a fellow named Connor, went over to Patrick's camp and apologized to him. Patrick returned and baptized all of the men assembled. He then blessed the man who had died, who immediately returned to life, and was also baptized. Patrick then criticized Maughold, saying he should have been helping his men to lead good lives, and told him he must make up for his evil.

As penance for his previous crimes, Patrick ordered him to abandon himself to God in a wicker boat without oars. Maughold drifted to this isle, where two of Patrick's disciples, Romulus and Conindrus (Romuil and Conindri), were already established. Tradition says he landed on the northeast corner of the Isle near Ramsey, at the foot of a headland since called Maughold Head, where he established himself in a cave on the mountainside. He is said to have been chosen by the Manx people to succeed Romuil and Conindri as bishop.

Maughold is today best remembered on the Isle of Man for his kind disposition toward the Manx natives. Several places on the island, including, Maughold parish, St Maughold's Well, and St Maughold's Chair are named after him.

References

External links
St Maughold’s Well
The Legend of St. Maughold
Folk-lore of the Isle of Man
Maughold Kids Stories Irish culture and customs

488 deaths
Manx saints
5th-century Christian saints
Manx religious leaders
Year of birth unknown